Rosalind (Polly) O’Hanlon  is a early modern historian and specialist in the colonial history of India. She is a retired Professor in Indian History and Culture at the Faculty of Asian and Middle Eastern Studies, University of Oxford. O'Hanlon is an Emeritus Fellow of Clare College. She was elected as a Fellow of the British Academy in 2020.

Select publications
O'Hanlon, R. 2010. "Letters Home: Banaras pandits and the Maratha Regions in early modern India", Modern Asian Studies 44 (2), 201-240.
O'Hanlon, R. 2013. "Performance in a World of Paper: Puranic Histories and Social communication in Early Modern India", Past and Present 219, 87-126.
O'Hanlon, R. 2014. At the Edges of Empire: Essays in the Social and Intellectual History of India.  New Delhi: Permanent Black. 
O'Hanlon, R. 2014. "'Pre-Modern'" Pasts: South Asia".  In Prasenjit Duara, Viren Murthy and Andrew Sartori (eds.), A Companion to Global Historical Thought. Hoboken: John Wiley and Sons. 108-121
O'Hanlon, R., Minkowski, C. and Venkatkishnan, A. (eds) 2015.  Discipline, Sect, Lineage and Community: Scholar-Intellectuals in Early Modern India.  Routledge: London and New York.

References

Living people
Fellows of the British Academy
Fellows of Clare College, Cambridge
Academics of the University of Oxford
Historians of India
Women historians
Year of birth missing (living people)